Events from the year 1866 in Canada.

Incumbents

Crown 
 Monarch – Victoria

Federal government
Parliament — 8th

Governors
Governor General of the Province of Canada — Charles Monck, 4th Viscount Monck 
Colonial Governor of Newfoundland — Alexander Bannerman
Governor of New Brunswick — Arthur Charles Hamilton-Gordon
Governor of Nova Scotia — Sir William Fenwick Williams
Governor of Prince Edward Island — George Dundas

Premiers
Joint Premiers of the Province of Canada –
John Alexander Macdonald, Canada West Premier
Narcisse-Fortunat Belleau, Canada East Premier 
Premier of Newfoundland — Frederick Carter
Premiers of New Brunswick — Albert James Smith then Peter Mitchell
Premiers of Nova Scotia – Charles Tupper
Premier of Prince Edward Island – James Colledge Pope

Events
May–June – The 1866 New Brunswick election
June 2 – Battle of Ridgeway: Fenians invade Canada, giving Irish republicans at home a greater advantage over the British back home
June 9 – At Danville, Canada East, a fire breaks out in a railway car containing  of ammunition. Private Timothy O'Hea, an Irish soldier, will be awarded the Victoria Cross for his leadership and initiative in fighting the fire.
August 6 – The Colonies of Vancouver Island and British Columbia are united, bearing the Mainland's name as the United Colonies of Vancouver Island and British Columbia but with the Island capital, Victoria, as the seat of government of the united colony.
December 4 – London Conference, conference on resolutions discussed in 1864, to be added to the British North America Act
The piano manufacturer Heintzman & Co. is incorporated.
Peter Edmund Jones graduates from Queen's University, becoming Canada's first indigenous medical doctor

Births

January to June
February 24 – Martha Black, politician and the second woman elected to the House of Commons of Canada (died 1957)
March 8 – John Wesley Dafoe, journalist and author (died 1944)
May 10 –  Constance Piers, journalist, poet and editor (died 1939)
May 11 – Edward Rogers Wood, financier (died 1941)
May 12 – Walter Charles Murray, first President of the University of Saskatchewan (died 1945)
June 14 – Henry Sproatt, architect (died 1934)

July to December
September 1 – Clifford William Robinson, lawyer, businessman, politician and 11th Premier of New Brunswick (died 1944)
September 12 – Freeman Freeman-Thomas, 1st Marquess of Willingdon, 13th Governor General of Canada (died 1941)
October 6 – Reginald Fessenden, inventor and radio pioneer (died 1932)
October 19 – Clarence Lucas, composer, lyricist, conductor and music professor (died 1947)
December 26 – Godfroy Langlois, politician, journalist and lawyer (died 1928)

Deaths
January 16 – David Willson, religious leader and mystic (born 1778)
January 28 – Robert Foulis, inventor, civil engineer and artist (born 1796)
February 3 – François-Xavier Garneau, notary, civil servant, poet and historian (born 1809)
February 19 – Charles Richard Ogden, Joint Premier of the Province of Canada (born 1791)
March 14 – Norman McLeod, Presbyterian minister (born 1780)
April 11 – Edward Bowen, lawyer, judge and politician (born 1780)
July 28 – Frédéric-Auguste Quesnel, politician, lawyer, and businessman (born 1785)
October 26 – John Kinder Labatt, brewer and founder of the Labatt Brewing Company (born 1803)
November 1 – Jean-Baptiste-Éric Dorion, journalist and politician (born 1826)

Historical documents
Sarnia, Canada West guards against Fenian attack

Charge given by a Canada West judge to a grand jury in the Fenian invaders case 

U.S. President Andrew Johnson hopes Canadian courts will show mercy to condemned Fenians 

Washington learns Fenian invaders' death sentences are to be commuted

References

 
Years of the 19th century in Canada
Canada
1866 in North America